Syed Khaled Ahmed (born 20 September 1992), known as Khaled Ahmed, is a Bangladeshi cricketer. He made his Test cricket debut for the Bangladesh cricket team in November 2018.

Domestic career
Ahmed made his first-class debut for Sylhet Division in the 2015–16 National Cricket League on 10 October 2015. He made his List A debut for Prime Doleshwar Sporting Club in the 2016–17 Dhaka Premier Division Cricket League on 5 May 2017. He made his Twenty20 debut for Dhaka Dynamites on 5 November 2017 in the 2017–18 Bangladesh Premier League.

In October 2018, in the match against Dhaka Metropolis in the 2018–19 National Cricket League, he took his maiden ten-wicket haul in first-class cricket. Later the same month, he was named in the squad for the Chittagong Vikings team, following the draft for the 2018–19 Bangladesh Premier League.

International career
In August 2018, Ahmed was one of twelve debutants to be selected for a 31-man preliminary squad for Bangladesh ahead of the 2018 Asia Cup. In October 2018, he was named in Bangladesh's Test squad for their series against Zimbabwe. He made his debut for Bangladesh against Zimbabwe on 11 November 2018. In December 2018, he was named in Bangladesh's team for the 2018 ACC Emerging Teams Asia Cup.

In February 2021, he was selected to play Bangladesh Emerging Team in their home series against Ireland Wolves.  In April 2021, he was named in Bangladesh's preliminary Test squad for their series against Sri Lanka.

In March 2022, he was named in Bangladesh's One Day International (ODI) squad for their series against South Africa. In June 2022, in the second match against the West Indies, Khaled took his first five-wicket haul in Test cricket.

References

External links
 

1992 births
Living people
Bangladeshi cricketers
Bangladesh Test cricketers
Bangladesh East Zone cricketers
Prime Doleshwar Sporting Club cricketers
Sylhet Division cricketers
Dhaka Dominators cricketers
Chattogram Challengers cricketers
People from Sylhet